Anne Manie, sometimes spelled Annemanie, is an unincorporated community in Wilcox County, Alabama, United States.  The community had a post office, with postmasters appointed from 1924 to 1964.

Geography

Demographics
According to the returns from 1850-2010 for Alabama, it has never reported a population figure separately on the U.S. Census.

References

Unincorporated communities in Alabama
Unincorporated communities in Wilcox County, Alabama